Anisocoria is a condition characterized by an unequal size of the eyes' pupils. Affecting up to 20% of the population, anisocoria is often entirely harmless, but can be a sign of more serious medical problems.

Causes
Anisocoria is a common condition, defined by a difference of 0.4 mm or more between the  sizes of the pupils of the eyes.

Anisocoria has various causes:
 Physiological anisocoria: About 20% of population has a slight difference in pupil size which is known as physiological anisocoria. In this condition, the difference between pupils is usually less than 1 mm.
 Horner's syndrome
 Mechanical anisocoria: Occasionally previous trauma, eye surgery, or inflammation (uveitis, angle closure glaucoma) can lead to adhesions between the iris and the lens.
 Adie tonic pupil: Tonic pupil is usually an isolated benign entity, presenting in young women. It may be associated with loss of deep tendon reflex (Adie's syndrome). Tonic pupil is characterized by delayed dilation of iris especially after near stimulus, segmental iris constriction, and sensitivity of pupil to a weak solution of pilocarpine.
 Oculomotor nerve palsy: Ischemia, intracranial aneurysm, demyelinating diseases (e.g., multiple sclerosis), head trauma, and brain tumors are the most common causes of oculomotor nerve palsy in adults. In ischemic lesions of the oculomotor nerve, pupillary function is usually spared whereas in compressive lesions the pupil is involved.
 Pharmacological agents with anticholinergic or sympathomimetic properties will cause anisocoria, particularly if instilled in one eye.  Some examples of pharmacological agents which may affect the pupils include pilocarpine, cocaine, tropicamide, MDMA, dextromethorphan, and ergolines. Alkaloids present in plants of the genera Brugmansia and Datura, such as scopolamine, may also induce anisocoria.
 Migraines

Diagnosis
Causes of anisocoria range from benign (normal) to life-threatening conditions.
Clinically, it is important to establish whether anisocoria is more apparent in dim or bright light to clarify if the larger pupil or smaller pupil is the abnormal one.
 Anisocoria which is worsened (greater asymmetry between the pupils) in the dark suggests the small pupil (which should dilate in dark conditions) is the abnormal pupil and suggests Horner's syndrome or mechanical anisocoria. In Horner's syndrome sympathetic nerve fibers have a defect, therefore the pupil of the involved eye will not dilate in darkness. If the smaller pupil dilates in response to instillation of apraclonidine eye drops, this suggests Horner's syndrome is present.
 Anisocoria which is greater in bright light suggests the larger pupil (which should constrict in bright conditions) is the abnormal pupil. This may suggest Adie tonic pupil, pharmacologic dilation, oculomotor nerve palsy, or damaged iris.

A relative afferent pupillary defect (RAPD) also known as a Marcus Gunn pupil does not cause anisocoria.

Some of the causes of anisocoria are 
life-threatening, including Horner's syndrome (which may be due to carotid artery dissection) and oculomotor nerve palsy (due to a brain aneurysm, uncal herniation, or head trauma).

If the examiner is unsure whether the abnormal pupil is the constricted or dilated one, and if a one-sided drooping of the eyelid is present then the abnormally sized pupil can be presumed to be the one on the side of the ptosis. This is because Horner's syndrome and oculomotor nerve lesions both cause ptosis.

Anisocoria is usually a benign finding, unaccompanied by other symptoms (physiological anisocoria). Old face photographs of patients often help to diagnose and establish the type of anisocoria.

It should be considered an emergency if a patient develops acute onset anisocoria. These cases may be due to brain mass lesions which cause oculomotor nerve palsy. Anisocoria in the presence of confusion, decreased mental status, severe headache, or other neurological symptoms can forewarn a neurosurgical emergency. This is because a hemorrhage, tumor or another intracranial mass can enlarge to a size where the third cranial nerve (CN III) is compressed, which results in uninhibited dilatation of the pupil on the same side as the lesion.

Popular culture 
 English singer David Bowie exhibited anisocoria, owing to a teenage injury.
 In the season 10 Big Bang Theory Comic-Con special, Steve Molaro told a story about how he first met actor Judd Hirsch and was taken aback by his dilated pupil. One of the other writers researched it and discovered that Judd Hirsch has anisocoria.
 American actress Melissa Benoist developed this condition in 2015.
 American artist Ze Frank has the condition. He was listed as second author on a paper published in The Journal of Neuroscience, which was featured briefly in episode 21 of the show named a show on May 25, 2012 called My Pupils, explaining that his study of neuroscience of vision was motivated by his harmless anisocoria condition.

Etymology
Anisocoria is composed of prefix, root and suffix:
 prefix: aniso- from the Greek language (meaning: unequal), which in turn comes from an: meaning not and iso: meaning equal
 the root word: cor, from the Greek word "korē" meaning: pupil of the eye
 -ia, which is a Latin suffix meaning: disease; pathological or abnormal condition

Thus, anisocoria means the condition of unequal pupil(s).

See also
 Cycloplegia
 Miosis
 Mydriasis
 Parinaud's syndrome
 Hippus

References

Further reading
 "Anisocoria." "Stedman's Medical Dictionary, 27th ed." (2000). 
 Victor, Maurice and Allan H. Ropper. "Adams and Victor's Principles of Neurology, 7th ed." (2001).

External links 

Eye diseases
Oculomotor nerve